East Dean is a hamlet and former civil parish, now in the parish of Mitcheldean, in the Forest of Dean district, in the county of Gloucestershire, England. 

East Dean became a township in 1844 and abolished as a civil parish on 1 April 1953.

The Forest of Dean was an extra-parochial area in the St Briavels hundred of Gloucestershire. It was without the usual parish structure until the West Dean and East Dean townships were formed in 1844. For poor relief, East Dean was grouped into the Westbury-on-Severn Poor Law Union and was included in the Westbury-on-Severn rural sanitary district. Following the Local Government Act 1894, East Dean became a civil parish in the East Dean and United Parishes Rural District, which was renamed East Dean Rural District in 1935.

The population of the parish was as follows:

In 1935 a new civil parish of Lydbrook was created from part of its area and transferred to West Dean Rural District.

The civil parish was abolished in 1953 and split to create the new parishes of Cinderford, Drybrook and Ruspidge. Part of the former area was transferred to the existing parishes of Awre, Littledean and Mitcheldean. The area of the former parish is now within the Forest of Dean district.

References

External links
Forest of Dean: Local government and public services, A History of the County of Gloucester: Volume 5: Bledisloe Hundred, St. Briavels Hundred, The Forest of Dean (1996)

Hamlets in Gloucestershire
Former civil parishes in Gloucestershire
Forest of Dean